Tito Conti (1842–1924) was an Italian painter, mainly of genre costume  or historical subjects.

Biography
He was born and lived in Florence, where he studied at the Institute of Fine Arts.

He was resident professor at the Academic College of Fine Arts of Florence. Among his works are: La Presentazione; Il quarto d'ora di Rabelais e La musica (1876); Il brindisi alla bettoliera; L'addio; Portrait of his wife; Il sospetto; Il Cantastorie; Il Moschettiere; and Per la passeggiata (1886, Florence). Among his pupils was Artuno Ricci.

With regards to Conti, who he grouped in thematic to Francesco Vinea and Edoardo Gelli, the contemporary American art collector James Jackson Jarves described him relative to the other two as showing "more refinement and higher artistic culture". While praising his "painting of tapestried backgrounds, ornate furniture, and elaborate details", he also disparaged the thematic, saying: "He paints too well for his subject. If his creative faculty were equal to his execution, he would be the first painter of his day."

References

External links
 . Paintings by Conti in British public collections.

1842 births
1924 deaths
Italian costume genre painters
19th-century Italian painters
Italian male painters
20th-century Italian painters
20th-century Italian male artists
Painters from Florence
19th-century Italian male artists